Rafe Custance (born 1994) is a New Zealand actor. He is famous for starring in the New Zealand children's drama The New Tomorrow, alongside his sister Lara Custance. His character, Dan, was a bit of a rebel and wanted to leave The Ants and join The Barbs. Rafe has also starred in The Killian Curse (TVNZ) where he played the role of Eddie.

References

External links
 

1994 births
Living people
New Zealand male television actors